
Gmina Łapy is an urban-rural gmina (administrative district) in Białystok County, Podlaskie Voivodeship, in north-eastern Poland.

Villages
Apart from the town of Łapy, Gmina Łapy contains the villages and settlements of Bokiny, Daniłowo Duże, Daniłowo Małe, Gąsówka-Oleksin, Gąsówka-Osse, Gąsówka-Skwarki, Gąsówka-Somachy, Łapy-Dębowina, Łapy-Kołpaki, Łapy-Korczaki, Łapy-Łynki, Łapy-Pluśniaki, Łapy-Szołajdy, Nowa Łupianka, Płonka Kościelna, Płonka-Kozły, Płonka-Matyski, Płonka-Strumianka, Roszki-Włodki, Roszki-Wodźki, Stara Gąsówka, Stara Łupianka, Uhowo and Wólka Waniewska.

Neighbouring gminas
Gmina Łapy is bordered by the gminas of Choroszcz, Poświętne, Sokoły, Suraż and Turośń Kościelna.

References
Polish official population figures 2006

Lapy
Białystok County